Edward Dario Mio (born January 31, 1954) is a Canadian former professional ice hockey goaltender who played in the World Hockey Association (WHA) for the Indianapolis Racers and Edmonton Oilers between 1977 and 1979, and in the National Hockey League (NHL) for the Oilers, New York Rangers, and Detroit Red Wings between 1979 and 1986.

Playing career
Mio attended Colorado College from 1972 to 76. During that time, he established himself as a standout, winning first- and second-team all-star awards and making the NCAA West first all-American team two years in a row.

In 1974, the National Hockey League's (NHL) Chicago Black Hawks and the World Hockey Association's (WHA) Vancouver Blazers both drafted him. He played for neither club, wending his way instead through the minor leagues with the Tidewater Sharks, Erie Blades, and Hampton Gulls until he surfaced with the Indianapolis Racers of the WHA.

With the Racers, Mio's goaltending was rough, but the most meaningful event of his career occurred when he met his lifelong friend, Wayne Gretzky. Shortly after their meeting, Mio was part of the trade that sent Gretzky (along with Peter Driscoll) to the Edmonton Oilers on November 2, 1978.

When the Oilers moved to the NHL for the 1979–80 season, Mio got his first NHL action, part of the young, highly talented lineup that included Gretzky, Mark Messier, Kevin Lowe, Glenn Anderson and Paul Coffey. Mio had his first winning season in 1980–81 before being traded to the New York Rangers.

In New York, Mio backstopped the Rangers for two seasons before rounding out his career with the Detroit Red Wings in 1985–86.

Post-hockey
Mio was Wayne Gretzky's best man at his wedding to Janet Jones. Mio was a player agent with International Management Group, representing Sergei Fedorov, Joe Thornton and Brent Johnson. In 2005, Mio became the director of player development for the Phoenix Coyotes. In 2010, having left the NHL, Mio considered running for mayor in his hometown of Windsor, Ontario. At the 2014 NHL Winter Classic, Mio played an exhibition game with the Detroit Red Wings alumni team, splitting time with Kevin Hodson in a winning effort against the Toronto Maple Leafs alumni team.

Mio has a daughter named Katya who was born April 30, 1988. He also has twin sons Grant and Edward Riordon who were born in 2000.

Career statistics

Regular season and playoffs

Awards and honors

References

External links
 
 Eddie Mio @ hockeygoalies.org

1954 births
Living people
Adirondack Red Wings players
AHCA Division I men's ice hockey All-Americans
Arizona Coyotes executives
Canadian ice hockey goaltenders
Canadian people of Italian descent
Chicago Blackhawks draft picks
Colorado College Tigers men's ice hockey players
Dallas Black Hawks players
Detroit Red Wings players
Edmonton Oilers (WHA) players
Edmonton Oilers players
Hampton Gulls (AHL) players
Ice hockey people from Ontario
Indianapolis Racers players
New York Rangers players
Sportspeople from Windsor, Ontario
Tidewater Sharks players
Vancouver Blazers draft picks
Wichita Wind players